"Lesson Learned" is a song by the American rock band Alice in Chains, featured on their fourth studio album, Black Gives Way to Blue (2009). It was released as the third and final single from the album on June 22, 2010. The song reached No. 4 on Billboard's Mainstream Rock Tracks, and No. 10 on Hot Rock Songs.

Music video
The music video for "Lesson Learned" was released on September 22, 2010 on Yahoo Music beta. It is also featured on Alice in Chains new YouTube channel. The video was conceived and co-directed by Paul Matthaeus, Bobby Hougham and Sevrin Daniels. Paul Matthaeus is best known for his groundbreaking main titles on the award-winning series Dexter, True Blood, and Six Feet Under. The video is composed of over 6,000 still pictures stitched together to create a visually stunning stop-frame animated clip. The video also is available in Explicit and Edited versions.

Personnel
Jerry Cantrell – lead vocals, lead guitar
William DuVall – rhythm guitar, backing vocals
Mike Inez – bass
Sean Kinney – drums

Chart positions

Weekly charts

Year-end charts

References

External links
 
 

2010 singles
Alice in Chains songs
Songs written by Jerry Cantrell
Song recordings produced by Nick Raskulinecz
2009 songs